Kidnapping is a crime in Canada. Throughout its history, a number of incidents have taken place.

Prevalence

According to Canadian law enforcement agencies, about 50,492 missing children were reported to be missing in 2009. From 2000-2001, of about 90 incidents reported, there were only two that were actually  stranger abduction, and in all other cases, the reports were in error.

However, parental kidnapping seems to be bigger issue. 83 out of 100 kidnapped children are found to be victim of parental abduction. In 2009, there were 237 reported parental abductions.

Law

Canadian law regards following instances to be a crime.

Every person commits an offence who abducts a person with intention.
To cause the person to be confined or imprisoned against the person’s consent;
To cause the person to be illegally sent or transported out of Canada against the person’s consent; or
To hold the person for release or to service against the person’s consent.

Notable incidents

References

 
Child abduction in Canada